Dharma is a 1998 Tamil-language action film directed by Keyaar. The film stars Vijayakanth and Preetha Vijayakumar. It was released on 9 July 1998. It was moderately successful at the box office. The film is a remake of the Hindi film Ziddi.

Plot

Dharma (Vijayakanth) lives with his lawyer father (Jaishankar), mother (Vadivukkarasi), journalist brother Vijay (Thalaivasal Vijay), and beloved sister Geetha (Shilpa). Later, Dharma and Sharmila (Preetha Vijayakumar) fall in love with each other. Dharma is an angry man who cannot tolerate injustice. One day, his sister is molested by the rowdy Raja, and Dharma kills him in public. Thus, he is sent to jail. In the meantime, his friend Ranjith (Ranjith) becomes an ACP.

Upon his release from jail, Dharma becomes a powerful gangster who punishes the rowdies in his own way and helps the poor. The honest chief minister (S. S. Rajendran) then gives free hand to arrest all the goons including Dharma. Geetha then marries Ranjith.

The drug smuggler Daas (Mansoor Ali Khan), the notorious killer Khan (Ponnambalam), and the land grabber Amarnath (Kazan Khan) work under a corrupted politician Chakravarthy (Vinu Chakravarthy). They decide to kill the current Chief Minister, but Vijay has listened to their plan and immediately informs Ranjith. Surprisingly, Ranjith kills Vijay from behind. In fact, Ranjith is Raja's brother (the man who was killed by Dharma) and wants to take revenge on Dharma.

Later, the Chief Minister is severely injured by the rowdies, but Dharma saves him and hides him in a secured place. Meanwhile, Geetha finds out that Vijay was killed by Ranjith, and Ranjith also kills her.

The police department seeks Dharma for kidnapping the Chief Minister. What transpires later forms the crux of the story.

Cast

Vijayakanth as Dharma
Preetha Vijayakumar as Sharmila
Shilpa as Geetha
Jaishankar as Dharma's father
Ranjith as Ranjith
S. S. Rajendran as the Chief Minister
Thalaivasal Vijay as Vijay
Vinu Chakravarthy as Chakravarthy
Mansoor Ali Khan as Daas
Ponnambalam as Khan
Kazan Khan as Amarnath
Manorama as Sharmila's grandmother
Vadivukkarasi as Dharma's mother
Ashwini
LIC Narasimhan
Singamuthu
Rajasekhar
Master Aravind
Baby Aarthi

Production
Since climax of original Hindi film took 90 days to shoot, KR decided to add the bomb blast scenes from Hindi film Ziddi in the Tamil version replacing Sunny Deol with Vijayakanth thereby shooting the climax in 3 days.

Soundtrack

The music was composed by Ilaiyaraaja, with lyrics by Pulamaipithan and Vaasan. The soundtrack was well received.

Reception
G of Kalki gave a negative review citing despite suiting Vijayakanth's image, the film lacks freshness.

References

External links

1998 films
1990s action drama films
Films scored by Ilaiyaraaja
Tamil remakes of Hindi films
1990s Tamil-language films
Indian action drama films
Indian gangster films
Indian vigilante films
1990s vigilante films
Films directed by Keyaar
1998 drama films